The 2019 UCI Urban Cycling World Championships was the third edition of the UCI Urban Cycling World Championships, and was held in Chengdu, China for the third consecutive year.

The 2019 championships comprised events in freestyle BMX and trials

Medal summary

Freestyle BMX

Flatland

Park

Mountain bike trials

20 inch

26 inch

Team

Medal table

References

External links

UCI

UCI Urban Cycling World Championships
UCI Urban Cycling World Championships